The 2016 World Junior Ice Hockey Championship Division III tournament was played in Mexico City, Mexico, from 15 to 24 January 2016. Division III represents the sixth tier of the World Junior Ice Hockey Championships. The champions, Mexico, were promoted to the Division II B for the 2017 tournament, and the last-placed nation (South Africa) were to be relegated to a qualification tournament for 2017, instead an eight-team Division III tournament was decided on in September 2016. Israel participated in a World Junior tournament for the first time since 1997, while Bulgaria returned after withdrawing from the 2015 tournament.

Participants

Standings

Results
All times are local (UTC–6).

Statistics

Top 10 scorers

Goaltending leaders
(minimum 40% team's total ice time)

Awards

Best Players Selected by the Directorate
 Goaltender:  Jaime Perez
 Defenceman:  Fatih Faner
 Forward:  Oliver Hay

References

External links
IIHF.com

III
World Junior Ice Hockey Championships – Division III
International ice hockey competitions hosted by Mexico
2016 in Mexican sports
Sports competitions in Mexico City
January 2016 sports events in Mexico
2010s in Mexico City